St. Stephens, St. Stephen's, Saint Stephens, or Saint Stephen's may refer to the following:

Population centers
 St. Stephens, Alabama, a town in the United States
 Saint Stephens, Nebraska, unincorporated community
 St. Stephen's, Newfoundland and Labrador, Canada
 St. Stephens, North Carolina, a town in the United States
 Saint Stephens, Ohio, an unincorporated community
 St. Stephens, Wyoming, a town in the United States
 St. Stephens Church, Virginia, a town in the United States
 St Stephens by Launceston Rural, a civil parish in Cornwall
 St Stephen-in-Brannel, colloquially known as St. Stephens, a village in Cornwall, United Kingdom

Education
 St. Stephen's College (disambiguation), a number of colleges
 St. Stephen's School (disambiguation), a number of schools
 St. Stephen's University in New Brunswick, Canada

Places of worship
 St Stephen's Chapel, a chapel in the old Palace of Westminster, London, England
 St. Stephen's Church (disambiguation), a list of churches named after Saint Stephen
 St. Stephen's Cathedral (disambiguation), a list of churches named after Saint Stephen

Other uses
 St. Stephen's Day, a Christian saint's day celebrated on 26 or 27 December
 St. Stephen's Green, a park in Dublin, Ireland
 St. Stephen's Hull, a shopping centre in Kingston upon Hull, England

See also
 St. Stephen (disambiguation)